In geometry, a rectified 120-cell is a uniform 4-polytope formed as the rectification of the regular 120-cell.

E. L. Elte identified it in 1912 as a semiregular polytope, labeling it as tC120.

There are four rectifications of the 120-cell, including the zeroth, the 120-cell itself. The birectified 120-cell is more easily seen as a rectified 600-cell, and the trirectified 120-cell is the same as the dual 600-cell.

Rectified 120-cell

In geometry, the rectified 120-cell or rectified hecatonicosachoron is a convex uniform 4-polytope composed of 600 regular tetrahedra and 120 icosidodecahedra cells. Its vertex figure is a triangular prism, with three icosidodecahedra and two tetrahedra meeting at each vertex.

Alternative names:
 Rectified 120-cell (Norman Johnson)
 Rectified hecatonicosichoron / rectified dodecacontachoron / rectified polydodecahedron
 Icosidodecahedral hexacosihecatonicosachoron
 Rahi (Jonathan Bowers: for rectified hecatonicosachoron)
 Ambohecatonicosachoron (Neil Sloane & John Horton Conway)

Projections

Related polytopes

Notes

References
 Kaleidoscopes: Selected Writings of H. S. M. Coxeter, edited by F. Arthur Sherk, Peter McMullen, Anthony C. Thompson, Asia Ivic Weiss, Wiley-Interscience Publication, 1995,  
 (Paper 22) H.S.M. Coxeter, Regular and Semi-Regular Polytopes I, [Math. Zeit. 46 (1940) 380-407, MR 2,10]
 (Paper 23) H.S.M. Coxeter, Regular and Semi-Regular Polytopes II, [Math. Zeit. 188 (1985) 559-591]
 (Paper 24) H.S.M. Coxeter, Regular and Semi-Regular Polytopes III, [Math. Zeit. 200 (1988) 3-45]
 J.H. Conway and M.J.T. Guy: Four-Dimensional Archimedean Polytopes, Proceedings of the Colloquium on Convexity at Copenhagen, page 38 und 39, 1965
 N.W. Johnson: The Theory of Uniform Polytopes and Honeycombs, Ph.D. Dissertation, University of Toronto, 1966

External links
 
 rectified 120-cell Marco Möller's Archimedean polytopes in R4 (German)
 
  Four-dimensional Archimedean Polytopes, Marco Möller, 2004 PhD dissertation  
 H4 uniform polytopes with coordinates: r{5,3,3}

4-polytopes